The Clutha Mata-Au River Parkway Group, Incorporated Society, New Zealand, started in December 2003, and is an Incorporated Society, with private charitable status only, being deregistered from New Zealand Charities Services in December 2021. The Group was set up in response to land development issues along the Clutha River / Mata-Au corridor, much of which has high scenic and recreational values. The project aims to establish a regional river parkway, including a river trail, along the entire 338 km river corridor from Lake Wānaka to the Pacific Ocean.

Description
The mission statement of the group is: 'To protect and improve the natural, recreational, and cultural values of the Clutha Mata-Au River corridor, from Lake Wānaka to the Pacific, by establishing a Clutha Mata-Au River Parkway, including a Clutha River Trail, with an integrated management body to safeguard the public interest with a long-term vision.'

The Parkway Group is working with trail-focused community groups, which include the Clutha Gold Trail Trust, and the Upper Clutha Tracks Trust, which was founded by Mr. Iain Grant Fyfe, Mr John Wellington, and Ms Rachel Brown, to develop a contiguous trail that is expected to become a popular tourism draw-card, bringing considerable economic benefits to the region, and facilitating further river corridor improvements such as native restoration. The Upper Clutha River Guardians were made as an extension of the Parkway Group from 2009-2012 and the Red Bridge River Park Trust, which was developed in 2014, having the same members, legal advisors, and financial planners. Mr. Jeromy van Riel was a founding member of the Red Bridge River Park Trust in its development and participated in a documentary video with Mr. Verduyn in October 2016 that was made by Ms. Aliscia Young and attended by Ms. Ella Lawton.

The project was initiated by Lewis Verduyn, a rafting operator on the Upper Clutha Mata-Au who has rafted the river since 1981 until his death in 2019. He was a Chairperson of the project and known to be an advocate for river protection and conservation, which was his passion. After his passing in 2019, the Parkway Group, also known as 'CMRP' had only one member remaining, Mr. Tim Ryan (Upper Clutha River Guardians). However the former trustees Mr Christopher Keith Steven and Mrs Anne Steven never resigned, along with Ms Robyn Hunt of Mead Stark, owned by Mr Alan McKay. 

the Clutha Mata-Au River Parkway Group, Incorporated Society, had stopped all local meetings in 2010 when their last meeting minutes were taken by Dr. Barrie Wills, who was a member for a number of years. 

Mr. Verduyn was also a part of the Upper Clutha River Guardians and The Red Bridge River Park Trust, which were extensions of the CMRP Group and has worked in collaboration with the Upper Clutha Tracks Trust and its members and beneficiaries. The Upper Clutha Tracks Trust was founded by Mr Iain Grant Fyfe and has received a significant amount of funding to extend the trails initially planned by Mr Verduyn and Mr Gilbert van Reenan.

The Clutha Mata-Au River Parkway Group, Incorporated Society, members consisted of Mr. Lewis Verduyn (founder), Mr. Richard Guy Steven (solicitor), Mrs. Anne Steven (landscape architect), Mr. Christopher Keith Steven (solicitor), Mr. Gilbert van Reenan, Dr. Barrie Wills, Ms. Robyn Hunt (accountant), Mr. John Harris, Dr. William Dacker, Mr. Tim Ryan (Upper Clutha River Guardians), Ms Leigh Morris, Mr Mike Floate, Mr Rodney Peirce and others.

The Clutha Mata-Au River is New Zealand's largest and most powerful river.  It carves 338 km from the Southern Alps to the Pacific Ocean, traversing the semi-desert interior of Otago known as Central Otago.

The waters of the Clutha Mata-Au are clear turquoise in the upper reaches, a characteristic that results from glacial and snow-melt filtering by upland lakes, especially Lake Wānaka. In global terms, this is rare, because glacially fed rivers are normally discoloured by rock flour. The Clutha Mata-Au is also often listed among the world's swiftest rivers. Didymo is still an existing problem within the river today.

History
Historically, the river has been the focus of intense gold mining. The Central Otago Gold Rush began in 1861, and it was this influx of people that led to the establishment of many of the river towns that still exist today, such as Alexandra, Clyde, and Cromwell. Today, some township planners have apparently been toying with developing the Red Bridge area in Luggate for tourist purposes. Hidden waterways surrounding this area have been known to hold gold deposits and quartz or river stones, which remain untouched for the most part. Remnants of Cantonese gold miners and tailings still exist in the area today that are at risk.

In 1956, a large hydroelectric dam was commissioned at Roxburgh, flooding the deep-sided Roxburgh Gorge and several well-known rapids, including the Molyneux Falls and the Golden Falls. Another large dam was commissioned at Clyde in 1992, flooding the Cromwell Gorge and the often-photographed Cromwell Junction where the silty Kawarau River merged reluctantly with the clear Upper Clutha. The Clyde Dam was highly controversial, having been mistakenly built above an active fault, the River Channel Fault.

The owners of these dams, Contact Energy, announced in February 2009 that they were revisiting former plans for four more large dams on the Clutha Mata-Au. Some people believe that this development would provide jobs and new lakes for recreation, and that the industrialisation of the river valley is an acceptable consequence. However, the Clutha Mata-Au River Parkway Group strongly opposes further damming of the river, as do many people in the river communities.

In October, 2009, the Clutha Mata-Au River Parkway Group facilitated the formation of the Clutha River Forum, an alliance of conservation groups and concerned individuals throughout Otago and New Zealand, who have resolved to work together to prevent further Think Big dams on the Clutha River. Members of the Forum include: Upper Clutha River Guardians, Clutha Mata-Au River Parkway Group, Incorporated Society, Central Otago Environmental Society (Save Central), Beaumont Residents Group, Lower Clutha River Guardians, Forest & Bird (Dunedin / Central – Lakes). The Forum is campaigning for "Option 5 - NO More Dams".

Mr. Verduyn was the key person who thought of 'Option 5' to make a plan to save the Clutha from further damming. He saw what happened in Cromwell with the dam there and put his heart and soul into preventing further large dam schemes because he believed they caused more harm than good to the natural environment.

There has been some concerns that the Clutha Mata-Au River Parkway Group, Incorporated Society, and some of its members, before its de-registration, were involved in not reporting donations and tax information to IRD and the New Zealand Charities Services over many years, along with some of the same member belonging to the Upper Clutha River Guardians, Incorporated Society, and the Red Bridge River Park Trust.

Both the Upper Clutha River Guardians and the Clutha Mata-Au River Parkway Group were de-registered by Charity Services. The former in 2013 and the latter in 2021. The brother charity or extension charity of these groups was the Red Bridge River Park Charitable Trust, which has been under investigation since 2019 by New Zealand Charities Services. 

The Red Bridge River Park Trust's only standing members have been Mr Jeromy van Riel and his longstanding legal partner, Ms Philippa O'Connell, as well as Mr Timothy Ryan who was a part of the Upper Clutha River Guardians and the Clutha Mata-Au River Parkway Group, Incorporated Society, since Mr Verduyn's death in 2019. Mr Ryan has not come forward with his trustee-ship although online articles show him to be a member. The remaining members have dissolved the Red Bridge River Park Trust in 2022 after the purchase and sale of property at 151 Church Road, Luggate, blaming another party of defaming their organization for financial discrepancies and questionable charity duty, apparently as a smokescreen to sell. 

No meetings or Meeting Minutes has been conducted for the Red Bridge River Park Trust since 2015. They have apparently not taken accountability for these discrepancies while under the guidance of Mr Iain Grant Fyfe and his law firm Fyfe-Karamaena Law, as well as the members of the CMRP Group- Mr Christopher Keith Steven of Wanaka Law, and Mr Richard Guy Steven of Wanaka Law and his wife- Ms Anne Steven. Mr Steven contracts for the New Zealand Police as an advising lawyer.

While New Zealand has been under the administration of Hon. Jacinda Ardern, there appears to have been a lack of regulations and monitoring of charities registered so far by New Zealand Charities Services and a lack of financial monitoring and investigations of charities by New Zealand Charities Services and IRD all-in-all. 

In November 2022, Hon Ardern and her cabinet have made a Bill to Amend the Charities Act 2005, to try to deregulate charities in New Zealand to allow them even more freedom not to report. 

The Clutha Mata-Au River Parkway Group, Incorporated Society, has not reported their donations or funding since 2012 properly while under the guidance of the Mr Iain Grant Fyfe of Checketts McKay Law and Fyfe-Karamaena Law, and Mr Richard Guy Steven of Wanaka Law. Both these law firms apparently do contract work for the New Zealand Police and remain in good standing despite any concerns of charity discrepancies of non-reporting existing under their direction. 

Apparently, many questionable financial discrepancies and concerns have taken place regarding the Clutha Mata-Au River Parkway Group, Incorporated Society,  and its brother organizations, being allowed by the New Zealand Government and its regulatory bodies of charities, to not report financial information properly or to be thoroughly investigated for financial discrepancies. Any organization members linked to previously deregistered organizations by the New Zealand Government appear to not be of much concern to the New Zealand Government or police when it comes to charity irregularities or even charity fraud against the Acts and Laws of New Zealand on a large scale. 

All registered charities in New Zealand are not to be developed for personal gain or profit, especially those given tax exempt benefits and status by the New Zealand Government. However, charities that make personal gains or profits are apparently commonly overlooked by the New Zealand Government such as the Red Bridge River Park Charitable Trust that has been for a number or years while claiming tax dividends and charity benefits and zero or little donations. 

During the Red Bridge River Park's sudden decision to dissolve itself in 2021-22, while working against the testamentary wishes of Mr Lewis Verduyn-Cassels, Mr Verduyn-Cassels's property and vision for the Clutha Mata-Au Parkway Group, Incorporated Society, and the Red Bridge River Park Trust went by the wayside after Mr van Riel and his partner, Ms Philippa O'Connell and Mr Ryan of the Clutha Mata-Au River Parkway Group, Incorporated Society, decided to sell Mr Verduyn's property for profit. This property was to be made into a public park and received its charity status and benefits only to be able to do this. They received NZ$100K discount on the property for being a charity, but instead it was sold for apparently for profit under the direction of Fyfe-Karamaena Law and Wanaka Law. The remaining members of the charities have made public claims to donate the proceeds from the sale of the property to other local charities to apparently justify their decision to sell the property and dissolve the Red Bridge River Park Charitable Trust entirely. So far, they still not have followed through with their word to dissolve. 

Claims have been made by the members of the Clutha Mata-Au River Parkway Group, Incorporated Society, and the Red Bridge River Park Trust, that their dissolution has been due to defamation allegations by someone but not of their own non-reporting or financial discrepancies over many years, along with their brother charities- the Clutha Mata-Au River Parkway Group and the Upper Clutha River Guardians who have been deregistered and were also legally guided by the same law firms who do contract work for the New Zealand Police in Southland.

Hon. Jacinda Ardern made a special trip to Wanaka in 2020 to meet Mr Jeromy van Riel of the Red Bridge River Park Trust after he made himself the Chairperson of the Red Bridge River Park Trust. There are public pictures of them standing together during her visit which went over a 2-3 day duration. This was before the Red Bridge River Park Trust went under investigation by Charities Services. Mr van Riel has texted Hon. Ardern private messages on her cell phone and this can be evidenced on Hon. Ardern's Facebook page. There has been no attempts of de-registration of the Red Bridge River Park Charitable Trust since apparently Hon. Ardern's contact with Mr van Riel and the Ministry of Business, Innovation and Employment, who regulates Charities Services, under Hon David Parker.

Hon Parker endorsed Judge Prudence Steven as a High Court Judge for the Environment. Judge Steven's brothers have been directly involved with the Clutha Mata-Au River Parkway Group, Incorporated Society. 

The New Zealand Labour Government has given a significant amount of funding to the Upper Clutha Tracks Trust for extended the trails, planned by the Clutha Mata-Au River Parkway Group, Incorporated Society, after Hon Steven was endorsed by Hon Parker. The New Zealand Government have made no further investigations of the Red Bridge River Park Charitable Trust at present.

Mr van Riel gifted Mr Ardern greenstone jewelry in 2020 when visiting him, which she has publicly worn on at least two occasions. This information has been confirmed publicly by Mr van Riel himself. Hon Ardern as a public servant is prohibited by her duty as the Prime Minister of New Zealand not to accept gifts from or to do favours for any members of the public or charities. 

The law firm that signed the charity registration for the Clutha Mata-Au River Parkway Group, Incorporated Society, was Wanaka Law, operated by Hon Steven's family members. This information can be found on the Incorporated Societies of New Zealand website. Wanaka Law consists of Mr Richard Guy Steven and his brother Mr Christopher Keith Steven (both owners), and Mr. Richard Guy Steven's wife, Ms Anne Steven who works at his office. These parties signed the charity registration for the Clutha Mata-Au River Parkway Group, Incorporated Society, in December 2004 when it first developed. This group did not get charity registration until the following year.  

Mr. Verduyn died in August 2019 and the cause of his death were self-inflicted due to a chronic illness. Mr Verduyn-Cassels also suffered from some mental distress before he died due to questionable acts with others due to charity non-reporting. 

Judge Steven worked at the Canterbury Chambers for a number of years with Mr. Marcus Elliot, who is now a coroner in the Canterbury District and throughout New Zealand. Of all the coroners across New Zealand, Coroner Elliot was the coroner assigned to investigate Mr. Verduyn-Cassels' death without being required by the Chief of Coroners or the Ministry of Justice to announce any conflicting interests in case management. Coroner Elliott has a pre-existing relationship with Judge Steven of several years and he currently shares an office located in the Justice Precinct Building in Christchurch with Judge Steven. Coroner Elliot had postponed in deciding Mr. Verduyn-Cassels' cause of death over three (3) years. During this time, the property that was to be converted into a park was sold by the Red Bridge river Park Trust for just under $NZ1 million.

Coroner Elliot has conflicting interests with the Steven's family who are the direct lawyers involved in this case who also contract with a New Zealand Police.   

Wanaka Law and Checketts McKay law firms sit right next-door to each other in the township of Wanaka on Pembroke Lane and Ardmore Street. Both these firms do contract work for the Wanaka and Southland Police and the Checketts McKay and Fyfe-Karamaena law firms get indirect referrals from the police for victims of crime at the Wanaka Community Networks where Mrs Karamaena is the lawyer, who is also the lawyer for the Red Bridge River Park Charitable Trust and other trusts. She arranged the land deal for the Red Bridge River Park Trust property to be sold.     

Although the Clutha Mata-Au River Parkway Group has been de-registered by Charity Services, it still has not been de-registered by the Incorporated Societies of New Zealand for some reason, nor have any further investigations by Charities Services or IRD been made for financial discrepancies and potentially charity fraud. 

Mr. Verduyn had invested over US$2 million that was partly from donations for both his charities the Clutha Mata-Au River Parkway Group and the Red Bridge River Park Trust from 2012-2019, which was not reported or taxed, nor monitored for over 4-7 years by the New Zealand Government. The Clutha Mata-Au River Parkway Group had been audited from 2007-2009 by the Ministry of Business, Innovation and Employment for financial discrepancies but not after this, even when it continued to exist reporting zero donations or little donations and appeared to pretend to no longer exist.

References

External links
 Clutha Mata-Au River Parkway
 Upper Clutha River Guardians
 Central Otago Environmental Society
 Beaumont Residents Group
 Save The Clutha
 Contact Energy
 Odt.co.nz
 Sargoodbequest.org.nz
 Otago Museum article
 Doc.govt.nz
 Webcitation.org
 Odt.co.nz

Environment of Otago
Environmental organisations based in New Zealand
Clutha River